Bihari Lal Fitrat was a historian who focused on the history of Mithila. His major work was the Aina-i-Tirhut which was written in Urdu and published in 1883. The book was important as it was considered the first serious attempt at cataloguing the history of Mithila.

Biography
Bihari Lal Fitrat was born in 1829 into an elite family in Darbhanga. He qualified as a lawyer in 1856 and was made an honorary magistrate in 1877. He later worked in the court of Raj Darbhanga. He was well versed in Maithili, Hindi, Urdu, Persian and Arabic.

In his Aina-i-Tirhut, he was very conscious of the distinct history and culture of Mithila and he asserts that: 

His book was one of the pioneering works in recording the history of Mithila.

References

History of Bihar
Writers of Mithila